Johann Sebastian Paetsch (born in Colorado Springs, U.S. on April 11, 1964) is an American cellist and musician.

Early musical education
Paetsch began his cello studies with his father, Günther Paetsch (who was also a cellist), at the age of 5, and gave his first recital when he was 6 years old. His extensive experience in chamber music began early in childhood with his large and talented family of 9. His three sisters Phebe, Michaela and Brigitte and his three brothers Christian, Engelbert and Siegmund all learned string instruments. He learned and performed almost the entire chamber music repertoire for strings with his family The Paetsch Chamber Music Ensemble in many concerts throughout the U.S.

Formal musical education
Paetsch studied at Butler University with the principal cellist of the Indianapolis Symphony, Arkady Orlovsky, where he received his bachelor's degree Cum Laude. He then furthered his cello studies at Yale University in New Haven, Connecticut with the famous cellist and teacher Aldo Parisot, where he earned his Certificate of Music Degree and later his master's degree in Music. He then went on to study in Germany at the Musikhochschule Lübeck with David Geringas where he received his ‘Konzertexamen’. He has participated in masterclasses with cellists such as Yo-Yo Ma, Mstislav Rostropovich, Janos Starker, Bernard Greenhouse and Mischa Maisky. As a member of the Yale Cellists, he took part in the recording of two world-famous CD’s.

Awards and recognition
A recipient of numerous prizes, Paetsch was awarded a top prize in the Emmanuel Feuermann Competition and the first place in the Young Musicians Foundation Competition in Los Angeles, CA. He was also highly successful in the ARD Competition, Munich, in the prestigious Tchaikovsky Competition in Moscow and in the Rostropovitch Competition, held in Paris.

Paetsch has performed regularly in Japan, Europe and North and South America. He has collaborated with artists such as Vadim Repin, Gidon Kremer, Jean-Bernard Pommier, Eduard Brunner and the Wilanow Quartet.

Life and career

As soloist, he has taken stage in many capitals of the world, performing concertos by Haydn, Dvořák, Shostakovich, Prokofiev, Schumann, Tchaikovsky and others. His performances and recordings of the Double Concerto (Brahms) in collaboration with sister and violinist Michaela Paetsch, have taken place in the USA, Canada, Switzerland and in Germany. He has been featured soloist with the Orchestra della Svizzera Italiana in performances and recordings of great pieces such as Boccherini, Camille Saint-Saëns, Kabalevsky and the two Haydn Concertos, as well as Don Quixote (Strauss) with conductor Alain Lombard.

At Yale University Paetsch met his future wife: violinist Yoko Miyagawa and they married in Lugano, Switzerland in 1994, who is daughter of Tadatoshi Miyagawa, and fifth cousin of the predecessor Emperor of Japan, Akihito. Paetsch's first daughter Raphaela, born in Lugano in 1996, also plays the cello. His daughter Valentina, born in 1998 plays the violin and his son Dominic plays the cello. Raphaela, Valentina and Dominic have performed string quintets in public with their father and mother. 

Since 1992 Paetsch has served as First Solo Cellist of the Orchestra della Svizzera Italiana in Lugano, Switzerland. He also was founder of a piano trio called the  Trio Ceresio, which has performed in Europe, Japan as well as Brazil.

Critical reception
Paetsch's work has been well received by a music critics worldwide. A writer from the Lübecker Nachrichten wrote "...a brilliant virtuoso piece which demanded all the finesse of everything that one could imagine from a cellist, delighted the audience and brought them to a thundering applause." A review in The Strad magazine applauded his cellistic abilities, saying he was "A CELLIST of extraordinary flair...His playing is at once stylish and communicative and of virtuoso stamp." In addition, a music critic from The New Haven Register wrote that "Paetsch brought great intensity and depth of understanding to this complex work.... the second movement was exquisitely eerie. His multiple-stop work stood out both for its lyrical beauty and technical excellence."

Compositions and transcriptions

Paetsch is also a noted champion of works transcribed for solo cello.  In 2013 Paetsch transcribed Franz Liszt's Piano Sonata in B minor, S.178, for solo cello. In 2015, he transcribed "3 Pieces from BWV 565, 903, and 1004" by Johann Sebastian Bach for solo cello. This include the Toccata and Fugue BWV 565, the Chromatic Fantasia BWV 903 and the Chaconne from Partita No. 2 BWV 1004.

References

External links
Johann Sebastian Paetsch pages maintained by the Internet Cello Society:
 Biography 
 Another biography 

1964 births
Living people
American classical cellists
Butler University alumni
Musicians from Colorado Springs, Colorado
Yale School of Music alumni
Child classical musicians
People from Lugano